Hal K. Dawson (October 17, 1896 – February 17, 1987) was an American actor.

Death
He died on February 17, 1987, in Loma Linda, California aged 90.

Selected filmography

 Another Language (1933)
 Dr. Socrates (1935)
 Music Is Magic (1935)
 Everybody's Old Man (1936)
 Public Enemy's Wife (1936)
 My American Wife (1936)
 Down the Stretch (1936)
 Libeled Lady (1936)
 We're on the Jury (1937)
 Park Avenue Logger (1937)
 Cafe Metropole (1937)
 She Had to Eat (1937)
 On Again-Off Again (1937)
Wife, Doctor and Nurse (1937)
 Danger – Love at Work (1937)
Second Honeymoon (1937)
 Wells Fargo (1937)
 The Nurse from Brooklyn (1938)
 Always Goodbye (1938)
 Keep Smiling (1938)
 Sweethearts (1938)
 Rose of Washington Square (1939)
 Joe and Ethel Turp Call on the President (1939)
 The Great Victor Herbert (1939)
Broadway Melody of 1940 (1940)
 Star Dust (1940)
 The Doctor Takes a Wife (1940)
 Washington Melodrama (1941)
 Week-End in Havana (1941)
 Song of the Islands (1942)
 The Magnificent Dope (1942)
 Baby Face Morgan (1942)
 Obliging Young Lady (1942)
 Hi Diddle Diddle (1943)
 Guest Wife (1945)
 Mr. Blandings Builds His Dream House (1948)
 Chicken Every Sunday (1949)
 Wabash Avenue (1950)
 Rhubarb (1951)
 Superman and the Mole Men (1951)
 The Captive City (1952)
 Park Row (1952)
 Bonzo Goes to College (1952)
 The Yellow Mountain (1954)
 The Benny Goodman Story (1956)
 The Tin Star (1957)
 Cattle Empire (1958)
 The Rat Race (1960) 
 Bat Masterson (1961)
 The Touch of Satan (1971)

Selected Television

References

External links
 
 

1896 births
1987 deaths
20th-century American male actors
American male film actors
American male stage actors
American male television actors
Male actors from Connecticut
People from Rockville, Connecticut